The 1927 Jericho earthquake was a devastating event that shook Mandatory Palestine and Transjordan on July 11 at . The epicenter of the earthquake was in the northern area of the Dead Sea. The cities of Jerusalem, Jericho, Ramle, Tiberias, and Nablus were heavily damaged and at least 287 were estimated to have been killed.

Earthquake 
Vered and Striem (1977) located the earthquake epicenter to be near the Damya Bridge in the Jordan Valley, and close to the city of Jericho. Later research by Avni (1999), located the epicenter to be around 50 km south of this location near the Dead Sea.

Effects

Mandatory Palestine

Jerusalem 
The death toll in Jerusalem included more than 130 people and around 450 were injured. About 300 houses collapsed or were severely damaged to the point of not being usable. The earthquake also caused heavy damage to the domes of the Church of the Holy Sepulchre and the al-Aqsa Mosque.

The rest of the country 
The earthquake was especially severe in Nablus where it destroyed around 300 buildings, including the Mosque of Victory and the historic parts of the Great Mosque of Nablus. The death toll in Nablus included more than 150 people and around 250 were injured.

In Jericho, a number of houses collapsed, including several relatively new hotels. In one of the hotels, three female tourists from India were killed.<ref>Duff, Douglas V. (1934) Sword for Hire.The Saga of a Modern Free-Companion. John Murray, London. 1st Edition. pp.219–227</ref> Ramla and Tiberias were also heavily damaged.

 Emirate of Transjordan 
The most affected city in Transjordan was Salt in which 80 people were killed. In the rest of Transjordan another 20 people were killed.

See also
 Dead Sea Transform
 List of earthquakes in 1927
 List of earthquakes in the Levant

References

Sources

 
 
 

 External links 

 Jerusalem Hit By Earth Jars – published in the Prescott Evening Courier on July 11, 1927
 104 Quake Toll In Holy Land – published in the Youngstown Vindicator on July 12, 1927
 300 reported Toll of Quake – published in the Milwaukee Journal'' on July 12, 1927
 Quake Reports From Palestine Yet Fragmentary – published in Newspapers on July 14, 1927
 

Earthquakes in the Levant
Earthquakes in Israel
Jericho earthquake, 1927
1927 in Mandatory Palestine
1927 in Transjordan
July 1927 events
1927 disasters in Asia